Admiral Robinson may refer to:

Adam M. Robinson Jr. (born 1950), U.S. Navy vice admiral 
Cloudesley Varyl Robinson (1883–1959), British Royal Navy rear admiral
Eric Gascoigne Robinson (1882–1965), British Royal Navy rear admiral
Frederick Robinson (Royal Navy officer) (1836–1896), British Royal Navy vice admiral
Guy Robinson (born 1967), British Royal Navy vice admiral
Mark Robinson (Royal Navy officer) (1722–1799), British Royal Navy rear admiral
Rembrandt C. Robinson (1924–1972), U.S. Navy rear admiral
Robert Spencer Robinson (1809–1889), British Royal Navy admiral
Samuel Robison (1867–1952), U.S. Navy admiral
Samuel Murray Robinson (1882–1972), U.S. Navy admiral
Sir Tancred Robinson, 3rd Baronet (c. 1685–1754), British Royal Navy rear admiral